Sheylani "Shey" Marie Peddy (born October 28, 1988) is an American basketball player for the Phoenix Mercury of the Women's National Basketball Association (WNBA). She was drafted by the Indiana Fever in the 2012 WNBA draft and has played for multiple professional teams, including the Flying Foxes (Austria), the Washington Mystics (USA), H.R. Le-Zion (Israel),the Chicago Sky (USA) and  TSV 1880 Wasserburg.

College
Peddy spent two years (freshman and sophomore) at Wright State University and two years (junior and senior) at  Temple University. She recorded 1,899 total points between the four years. At her senior year at Temple, she averaged 17.6 points, 4.8 rebounds, and 3.1 assists per game.

College statistics
Source

Professional career
Peddy signed with the Washington Mystics on June 29, 2020, and made her debut for the team on the opening day of the season.

WNBA career statistics

Regular season

|-
|style="text-align:left;"| 2019
| style="text-align:left;"| Washington
| 15 || 0 || 4.7 || .615 || .500 || 1.000 || 0.6 || 0.5 || 0.3 || 0.0 || 0.2 || 1.7
|-
| style='text-align:left;'|2020
| style='text-align:left;'|Washington
| 9 || 0 || 12.9 || .310 || .133 || 1.000 || 1.2 || 1.2 || 0.8 || 0.0 || 0.9 || 3.6
|-
| style='text-align:left;'|2020
| style='text-align:left;'|Phoenix
| 8 || 0 || 17.6 || .292 || .105 || 1.000 || 3.0 || 2.4 || 1.5 || 0.1 || 0.9 || 4.0
|-
| style='text-align:left;'|2021
| style='text-align:left;'|Phoenix
| 32 || 5 || 17.5 || .412 || .333 || .920 || 2.3 || 2.5 || 0.9 || 0.1 || 1.0 || 5.4
|-
| style='text-align:left;'|2022
| style='text-align:left;'|Phoenix
| 34 || 24 || 28.6 || .418 || .329 || .889 || 3.8 || 3.4 || 1.6
 || 0.2 || 1.4 || 9.9
|-
| style='text-align:left;'| Career
| style='text-align:left;'| 5 years, 2 teams
| 98 || 29 || 19.0 || .407 || .309 || .922 || 2.5 || 2.4 || 1.1 || 0.1 || 1.0 || 6.1

Playoffs

|-
|style="text-align:left;"| 2020
| style="text-align:left;"| Phoenix
| 2 || 1 || 21.0 || .455 || .375 || 1.000 || 3.0 || 1.5 || 3.0 || 0.5 || 0.5 || 7.5
|-
| style='text-align:left;'|2021
| style='text-align:left;'|Phoenix
| 11 || 4 || 23.2 || .382 || .258 || .722 || 3.5 || 2.5 || 2.0 || 0.0 || 0.9 || 6.6
|-
| style='text-align:left;'|2022
| style='text-align:left;'|Phoenix
| 1 || 1 || 26.0 || .231 || .286 || .000 || 2.0 || 5.0 || 2.0 || 0.0 || 1.0 || 8.0
|-
| align="left" | Career
| align="left" | 3 years, 1 team
| 14 || 6 || 23.1 || .370 || .283 || .750 || 3.4 || 2.5 || 2.1 || 0.1 || 0.9 || 6.9
|}

Awards
2011-12 Atlantic 10 Women's Basketball Player of the Year
2011-12 Atlantic 10 Women's Basketball Defensive Player of the Year 
2x Big 5 Player of the Year

References

External links
Temple Owls bio

1988 births
Living people
American expatriate basketball people in Austria
American expatriate basketball people in Germany
American expatriate basketball people in Israel
American women's basketball players
Basketball players from Massachusetts
Indiana Fever draft picks
Phoenix Mercury players
Point guards
Temple Owls women's basketball players
Washington Mystics players
Wright State University alumni